is a former Japanese football player.

Playing career
Mizuuchi was born in Kanagawa Prefecture on November 19, 1972. After graduating from high school, he joined Mitsubishi Motors (later Urawa Reds) in 1991. Although initially he could hardly play in the match, he played many matches instead Masahiro Fukuda and Koichi Hashiratani who got hurt. He moved to Japan Football League club Brummell Sendai in 1996. He retired end of 1997 season.

Club statistics

References

External links

Horipro official site
Official blog

1972 births
Living people
Association football people from Kanagawa Prefecture
Japanese footballers
Japan Soccer League players
J1 League players
Japan Football League (1992–1998) players
Urawa Red Diamonds players
Vegalta Sendai players
Association football forwards